Nikolay Dmitrievich Kovalyov (6 August 1949 – 5 April 2019) was a Russian politician and member of the State Duma, where he chaired the Duma's Veterans' Committee. Kovalyov was the Director of the FSB from July 1996 to July 1998, when he was succeeded by Vladimir Putin.

Biography 
Nikolay Kovalyov joined the KGB in 1974. He was appointed General of the Army in 1997. In 1999 he was elected a deputy to the State Duma of the Russian Federation.

He said in 1996: "There has never been such a number of spies arrested by us since the time when German agents were sent in during the years of World War II." He also publicly speculated that Boris Berezovsky might be involved in the death of Alexander Litvinenko.

During the Bronze Soldier Controversy in 2007, Kovalyov led a "fact finding mission" to Estonia, where the authorities were relocating a World War II memorial, including a two meter tall bronze soldier in a Soviet uniform. Before leaving Moscow, Kovalyov asked Estonia's government to step down. The two-day visit by the Russian fact finding delegatíon, originally set up to defuse a diplomatic dispute over the Bronze Soldier statue, only appeared to have escalated the feud, with the Estonian foreign minister and other Government officials refusing to meet with Kovalyov's delegation.

Honours and awards
 Order of Merit for the Fatherland;
3rd (20 April 2006)   for outstanding contribution to law-making and long-term diligent work
4th class
 Order of Military Merit
 Order of the Red Star
 Medal for Merits in perpetuating the memory of the fallen defenders of the Fatherland  (Russian Ministry of Defence, 2008)   for his great personal contribution to the commemoration of the fallen defenders of the Fatherland, the establishment of names of the dead and the fate of missing servicemen, displaying high moral and business qualities, diligence and intelligent initiative, to assist in the task of perpetuating the memory of the fallen defenders of the Fatherland
 Diploma of the Russian Federation President (9 January 2010)   for services in legislative activities and the development of Russian parliamentarism

References

External links 
 Official web page at the Russian State Duma 
 Federal Service of Security

1949 births
KGB officers
2019 deaths
Recipients of the Order "For Merit to the Fatherland", 3rd class
Recipients of the Order of Military Merit (Russia)
United Russia politicians
21st-century Russian politicians
Directors of the Federal Security Service
Burials at the Federal Military Memorial Cemetery
Generals of the army (Russia)
Third convocation members of the State Duma (Russian Federation)
Fourth convocation members of the State Duma (Russian Federation)
Fifth convocation members of the State Duma (Russian Federation)
Sixth convocation members of the State Duma (Russian Federation)
Seventh convocation members of the State Duma (Russian Federation)